L'Escale is a commune in the Alpes-de-Haute-Provence department in southeastern France. It is located on the eastern bank of the Durance opposite Château-Arnoux-Saint-Auban.

Geography

The Bléone forms the commune's southern border, then flows into the Durance, which forms the commune's western border.

L'Escale Dam
Work began on the dam in 1959, which was completed in 1963. With a height of 30ms it retains 15.70 hm³ of water. It is 126 metres long with a road carriageway along which runs the Route Napoleon. There is attached to the dam a power station whose three units produce a total of 170,000 KWs of electricity.

Population

See also
Communes of the Alpes-de-Haute-Provence department

References

Communes of Alpes-de-Haute-Provence
Alpes-de-Haute-Provence communes articles needing translation from French Wikipedia